Zeuxidia doubledayi , the Scarce Saturn, is a large butterfly that belongs to the Morphinae group of the family Nymphalidae. It was described by John Obadiah Westwood in 1851. It is found in the Indomalayan realm.

Subspecies
Z. d. doubledayi (Peninsular Malaysia, Singapore)
Z. d. horsfieldi C. & R. Felder, [1867] (Borneo)
Z. d. sumatrana Fruhstorfer, 1906 (Sumatra: low elevations)
Z. d. nicevillei Fruhstorfer, 1895 (Sumatra: Battak Mountains)
Z. d. anaxilla Fruhstorfer, 1911 (Bangka)

References

External links
 "Zeuxidia Hübner, [1826]" at Markku Savela's Lepidoptera and Some Other Life Forms

Butterflies described in 1851
Zeuxidia